Guillermo Antonio Iriarte González (born November 12, 1982 in Puebla City, Puebla) is a former Mexican professional footballer who last played for FC Juárez on loan from Lobos BUAP of Liga MX.

External links

Liga MX players
Living people
1982 births
Mexican footballers
Club Puebla players
Lobos BUAP footballers
People from Puebla (city)
Association football goalkeepers